Wyoming Highway 221 was a  east–west Wyoming State Road known as Fox Farm Road located in southeastern Cheyenne.

Route description
Wyoming Highway 221 traveled from I-25 Business/US 85/US 87 Business (South Greeley Highway) to Wyoming Highway 212 (College Avenue). Highway 221 paralleled Interstate 80 about one-half mile south of the Interstate and served residential and commercial areas. The route was decommissioned in 2009; all state route marker signs have been removed, and the route no longer appears on the Wyoming Official State Highway Map.

Major intersections

See also

References

External links 

Cheyenne @ RockyMountainRoads.com
Wyoming State Routes 200-299
WYO 221 - WYO 212 to I-25 BUS/US 85/US 87 BUS

221
Transportation in Laramie County, Wyoming
221